Ali Bolaghi or Alibolaghi may refer to:
 Ali Bolaghi, Ardabil
 Ali Bolaghi, East Azerbaijan
 Ali Bolaghi, Kermanshah
 Ali Bolaghi, Miandoab, West Azerbaijan Province
 Ali Bolaghi, Salmas, West Azerbaijan Province